George Macartney may refer to:

George Macartney (British Army officer) (died 1730)
George Macartney (1672–1757), MP for Belfast, Newton Limavady and Donegal
George Macartney (died 1724), MP for Belfast
George Macartney, 1st Earl Macartney (1737–1806), first British Ambassador to China
George Hume Macartney (1793–1869), MP for Antrim
George Macartney (British consul) (1867–1945), British consul-general in Kashgar
George Macartney (Australian politician), member of the Victorian Legislative Assembly
George McCartney (born 1981), footballer